William (Bill) Crosbie (31 January 1915 – 15 January 1999) was a Scottish painter. His work hangs in all major museums and galleries in Scotland and is part of the Royal Collection.

Early life
Crosbie was born in Hankow, China of Scottish parents. The family returned to Glasgow in 1926, where Bill attended Glasgow Academy and, from 1932 to 1934, the Glasgow School of Art. On leaving art school he travelled in Europe on a Haldane Travelling Scholarship.  From 1937 to 1939 Crosbie lived in Paris, where he studied under Léger and Maillol. He describing his time in Leger's studio as one of my proudest experiences.

Work
He was at the centre of what he once described as  "a little local Renaissance",  which included Hugh MacDiarmid,  J D Fergusson,  James Bridie,  T J Honeyman, and Basil Spence. Other regulars at his studio were the refugee artists Jankel Adler and Josef Herman, as well as Duncan Macrae  (whose portrait by Crosbie is now hanging in the People's Palace).

An important part of Crosbie's work after the war were his mural paintings, largely commissioned through his association with architects like Basil Spence and Jack Coia. His commissions included a mural for the Festival of Britain in 1951. Crosbie also produced illustrations for books and designed the scenery for a ballet.

Crosbie was among the finest and most singular Scottish painters of the twentieth century.  His paintings hang in all the major museums and galleries in Scotland as well as the Royal Collection and the British Museum in London, and in private collections throughout the United Kingdom and abroad. There were major retrospective exhibitions of Crosbie's work at Aitken Dott's in 1980, Ewan Mundy's, 1990, and Perth Museum and Art Gallery, 1990.

References

External links 
 
 National Galleries Scotland

1915 births
1999 deaths
20th-century Scottish painters
Scottish male painters
British expatriates in China
20th-century Scottish male artists